Matt Kobyluck (born February 19, 1970) is a driver in the NASCAR K&N Pro Series East, a regional stepping-stone series to NASCAR's national divisions. Kobyluck, who celebrated his 10th season in the NCWS East in 2008, is one of the few drivers left that competed under the old Busch North Series banner, and is the only driver of Native American descent in the series.

Career

Kobyluck began his career in 1993 driving in the popular Late Model division at Waterford Speedbowl in his home state of Connecticut. There, he posted numerous wins, top-five, and top-10 finishes – proving his ability to maneuver around the tight confines of a 3/8 mile bullring. His ease behind the wheel caught the attention of fellow competitors, and before long, he was asked to add to his already demanding schedule by piloting a car in the Modified division. His continued success left Kobyluck looking for new challenges.

In 1997, the Uncasville native moved on to Stafford Motor Speedway’s Pro Stock division. The demanding ½-mile track proved to be the challenge Kobyluck needed as he looked forward to NASCAR’s premier regional series – the NASCAR Camping World East Series (then called the Busch North Series). An accident that occurred during one of his races at Stafford in 1998 put those plans on hold temporarily as Kobyluck recovered from extensive injuries he sustained in the crash. By August of that year, ahead of the doctor’s recovery schedule, Kobyluck’s determination and strength enabled him to get back behind the wheel and pursue his dream. That fall, with Mohegan Sun Casino on board, Matt made his NASCAR Camping World Series debut at New Hampshire Motor Speedway.

Kobyluck took on a full NASCAR Camping World Series East schedule in 1999 and has since started more than 150 races with 14 wins, over 50 top-five’s, and 80 top-10 finishes. He also won the prestigious NASCAR Toyota All-Star Showdown in 2006.

Kobyluck came close to winning the East Series championship in 2002 when the series title came down to the last race at Lime Rock Park when Andy Santerre beat him out by a mere nine points. He has finished in the top-five in season ending points for the last three years, and in the top-10 for last six years.

In September 2008, Kobyluck clinched the 2008 NASCAR Camping World Series Championship with a third-place finish at Dover International Speedway. Kobyluck is the first Native American to win a championship in the series. Kobyluck then finished off his 2008 season in January 2009 by winning a second Toyota All-Star Showdown.

Kobyluck is also the president of a large construction, site development, and trucking company based in Connecticut.

Motorsports career results

NASCAR
(key) (Bold – Pole position awarded by qualifying time. Italics – Pole position earned by points standings or practice time. * – Most laps led.)

Busch Series

K&N Pro Series East

Camping World West Series

References

External links
 
 

Living people
1970 births
People from Montville, Connecticut
Racing drivers from Connecticut
NASCAR drivers
Native American sportspeople